Koba-Tatema   is a town and sub-prefecture in the Boffa Prefecture in the Boké Region of western Guinea. As of 2014 it had a population of 50,644 people.

References

Sub-prefectures of the Boké Region